Australian Defence Vessel (ADV) Ocean Protector is an auxiliary naval vessel of the Royal Australian Navy manned and managed by Teekay.

Design and construction 
The propulsion machinery is diesel-electric. A platform suitable for landing a medium helicopter is sited forward, above the bridge. For offshore support duties,  of deck area is available, and a 140 tonne crane is fitted.

In Australian Customs service, the ship's normal complement was made up of 22 ship's crew contracted from Teekay, plus up to 50 Customs and associated personnel, along with austere accommodation for a further 120 in a retrofitted deckhouse module. Two .50 caliber machine guns were fitted, along with two  rigid hull Customs Rescue Tenders.

Operational history 
The ship was laid down at the Aker Yards ASA in Tulcea, Romania on 25 August 2006 as a ROV support vessel for Norwegian shipping company DOF Subsea. Based on the Aker ROV 06 DE design, it was named Geo Bergen during construction and launched on 28 January 2007. The ship was renamed to Skandi Bergen on 19 July 2007 prior to its completion on 3 August 2007.

In mid-2010, the Australian government chartered the ship for the Australian Customs and Border Protection Service, as a replacement for MV Oceanic Viking. The ship was chartered to Customs through DMAA Seaforce. Modifications for Customs service were made by Forgacs Engineering in Newcastle, New South Wales, including the installation of the austere accommodation and medical deckhouse (the latter staffed by a doctor drawn from the Australian Antarctic Division), fitting of weapons and davits for the two Customs tenders, modification and expansion of crew recreation facilities, and sealing of the ship's moon pools.  On completion, the ship was renamed and redesignated "Australian Customs Vessel (ACV) Ocean Protector". Ocean Protector entered Customs Service in October 2010.

During November 2010, the vessel intercepted suspected drug smugglers off Queensland, and intercepted two asylum seeker boats off Christmas Island in November 2010.

In January 2012, Ocean Protector retrieved three Australian anti-whaling activists who had boarded MV Shōnan Maru 2.

In November 2015, DOF announced the sale of the vessel to the Australian government for NOK 300 million, with the ship to be handed over in early 2016. Upon completion of the sale, the ship was renamed the Australian Defense Vessel (ADV) Ocean Protector.

As of 2021, the ship is operating as an Auxiliary Navy Ship manned and managed by Teekay. The ship was recently called upon to assist in offloading cargo from MV Borkum to the wharf at Christmas Island by acting as an artificial lee as severe weather hampered it from getting closer to the wharf.

Citations

References
Books

External links

 Skandi Protector at DOF ASA website

Ships built in Romania
Patrol vessels of the Marine Unit (Australian Border Force)
2007 ships